Irén Ágay (23 February 1912 —2 September 1950) was a Hungarian actress. She was a leading star of 1930s Hungarian cinema, before emigrating to the United States.

Selected filmography
 Romance of Ida (1934)
 Everything for the Woman (1934)
 Emmy (1934)
 Her Highness Dances the Waltz (1935)
 Szenzáció (1936)
 Half-Rate Honeymoon (1936)
 Hochzeitsreise zu 50% (1937)
 Maga lesz a férjem (1938)
 The Fabulous Suzanne (1946)

References

External links
 

1912 births
1950 deaths
Hungarian film actresses
Actresses from Budapest
20th-century Hungarian actresses
Hungarian emigrants to the United States